Tadaoto Kainosho (December 23, 1894 – June 16, 1978) was a Japanese actor and costume designer. He was nominated for the Academy Award for Best Costume Design for his work in the jidaigeki film Ugetsu (1953).

References

External links 

Japanese costume designers
1894 births
1978 deaths